is a throw in judo. It is one of the traditional forty throws of judo as developed by Jigoro Kano. It belongs to the first group, Dai Ikkyo, of the traditional throwing list, Gokyo (no waza), of Kodokan Judo. It is also part of the current official throws of Kodokan Judo. It is classified as a hand technique, te-waza, and is the second throw performed in the Nage-no-kata. Seoi nage literally means "over the back throw", but has also been translated as a "shoulder throw", as the opponent or uke is thrown over the thrower or tori's shoulder.

Variations

The specific techniques of morote-seoi-nage (two hands seoi-nage), or eri-seoi, are usually generalised as simply seoi-nage. The distinctive technical aspect of this classification is that tori (the one executing the technique) grips with their two hands, as opposed to Ippon Seoi Nage, in which only one hand remains gripping while the other slides under uke's (the one receiving the technique) armpit. Additionally, reverse seoi-nage involves spinning up to 360 degrees so that uke ends up being thrown backwards rather than forward, as in other variations. Renowned seoi-nage martial artists are Isao Okano and Toshihiko Koga, and renowned reverse seoi-nage judoka is Choi Min-ho, who popularised the variation.

Origin
Seoi nage is likely to have developed from the jujutsu throw empi nage  in which an arm bar is used as leverage to throw uke over tori’s shoulder.

See also 
 Kodokan
 The Canon Of Judo
 Ippon Seoinage
 Isao Okano
 Toshihiko Koga

Notes

References 
 Ohlenkamp, Neil (2006) Judo Unleashed basic reference on judo. .

Further reading

External links 
 Information on the Techniques of Judo
 Example video demonstration

Judo technique
Throw (grappling)